The 1991 Mediterranean Games football tournament was the 11th edition of the Mediterranean Games men's football tournament. The football tournament was held in Athens, Greece between 28 June and 12 July 1991 as part of the 1991 Mediterranean Games and was contested by 11 teams and for the first time and since this edition, all countries were represented by the olympic teams. The host team, Greece, won the golden medal.

Participating teams
Eleven olympic teams took part to the tournament, 4 teams from Africa and 7 teams from Europe.

Squads

Venues

Tournament
All times local : CET (UTC+2)

Group stage

Group A

Group B

Group C

Group D

Knockout stage

Semi-finals

Third place match

Final

Tournament classification

References

1991
Sports at the 1991 Mediterranean Games
1991 in African football
1991 in Asian football
1991